Roberto Bautista Agut was the defending champion, but lost in the second round to Nicolas Mahut.

Mahut went on to win his second title at 's-Hertogenbosch, defeating David Goffin in the final, 7–6(7–1), 6–1

Seeds
The top four seeds receive a bye into the second round.

Draw

Finals

Top half

Bottom half

Qualifying

Seeds

Qualifiers

Lucky loser
  Kenny de Schepper

Qualifying draw

First qualifier

Second qualifier

Third qualifier

Fourth qualifier

References
 Main Draw
 Qualifying Draw

2015 ATP World Tour
2015 Men's Singles